Josée Forest-Niesing (December 18, 1964 – November 20, 2021) was a Canadian lawyer and politician, who was appointed to the Senate of Canada in October 2018.

Biography
A trial lawyer from Sudbury, Ontario, she served on the boards of the Art Gallery of Sudbury, the Carrefour Francophone de Sudbury, the University of Sudbury and the Ontario Arts Council.

Forest-Niesing was hospitalized due to COVID-19 in October 2021; she had an autoimmune condition affecting her lungs, which increased her vulnerability to the virus. She was discharged on November 14, but died a few days later on November 20, 2021, at the age of 56. Forest-Niesing had two children with her husband, Robert.

References

External links
 

1964 births
2021 deaths
Lawyers in Ontario
Canadian senators from Ontario
Independent Canadian senators
Women members of the Senate of Canada
Women in Ontario politics
Politicians from Greater Sudbury
Franco-Ontarian people
Deaths from the COVID-19 pandemic in Canada